Robert Benson, 1st Baron Bingley,  (c. 16769 April 1731), of Red Hall, near Wakefield, Bramham Hall, Yorkshire and Queen Street, Westminster was an English Tory politician who sat in the English and British House of Commons from 1702 until 1713 when he was raised to the peerage as Baron Bingley and sat in the House of Lords. He served as Chancellor of the Exchequer from 1711 to 1713.

Life
Robert Benson was born in Wakefield, the son of Robert Benson of Wrenthorpe. He went to school in London before studying at Christ's College, Cambridge.

He served as an alderman of the city of York and was elected Lord Mayor of York for 1707. He was elected Member of Parliament for Thetford in Norfolk from 1702 to 1705, then becoming MP for York from 1705 to 1713.

In 1711, he was sworn of the Privy Council and became Chancellor of the Exchequer until 1713. He was a Director of the South Sea Company from July 1711 to February 1715. In 1713 he was ennobled as Baron Bingley, and became the British ambassador to Spain.

Benson founded the stately home of Bramham Park, near Wetherby, Yorkshire.

When he died in 1731 he was buried in Westminster Abbey and the title Baron Bingley became extinct, although it was later re-created for his son-in-law. He had married Elizabeth, the daughter of Hon. Heneage Finch, and had a son (who predeceased him) and two daughters (one illegitimate). It has often been suggested that Bingley was also the real father of the British soldier, dramatist and politician John Burgoyne, whose debts he cancelled in his will. The residue of his estate, including Bramham Park, went to his daughter Harriet who had married George Fox.

Notes

References

1670s births
1731 deaths
Alumni of Christ's College, Cambridge
Lord Mayors of York
Barons in the Peerage of Great Britain
Peers of Great Britain created by Queen Anne
Chancellors of the Exchequer of Great Britain
Diplomatic peers
Members of the Privy Council of Great Britain
Members of the Parliament of Great Britain for English constituencies
Treasurers of the Household
British MPs 1707–1708
British MPs 1708–1710
British MPs 1710–1713
Ambassadors of Great Britain to Spain
English MPs 1702–1705
English MPs 1705–1707